Gaius Furius Pacilus was a consul of the Roman Republic in 412 BC.

Furius belonged to the Furia gens, a patrician family which was at its height of its power at this time in the Republic. Furius father was Gaius Furius Pacilus Fusus, consul in 441 BC. Furius had no known children, but the later Gaius Furius Pacilus, consul in 251 BC, is most likely a descendant. The Pacili relationship to the other Furii is unknown, but there is a possibility, considering his fathers cognomen, that the Furii Fusi belong to the same branch.

Career 
Furius was elected as one of the consuls in 412 BC, sharing the office with Quintus Fabius Vibulanus Ambustus. Both consulars held the imperium for the first time. There is little noted of events during the year (with the exception of an agrarian law being proposed by one of the plebeian tribunes) and both consulars are not seen in our records following their consulship.

See also

References 

5th-century BC Roman consuls
412 BC
Furii